Roupell is a surname. Notable people with the surname include:

Arabella Elizabeth Roupell (1817–1914), English flower painter
George Roupell, VC (1892–1974), British army officer
George Leith Roupell (1797–1854), English physician
William Roupell (1831–1909), English politician, forger and fraudster